Lisa-Marie Buckwitz (born 2 December 1994) is a German bobsledder. She won a gold medal in the two-woman event at the 2018 Winter Olympics, and also competed at the 2022 Winter Olympics.

Career
Buckwitz started off as a heptathlete. Buckwitz took up bobsleigh in 2013, and trains at the  club. She won two junior championships. 

In 2015, Buckwitz and Cathleen Martini won the two-woman Bobsleigh World Cup event in Königssee. In 2016, Buckwitz and Stephanie Schneider won a bronze medal in the two-woman at the Bobsleigh European Championship, and came fourth in the two-woman event at the IBSF World Championships in Igls, Austria. In 2017, Buckwitz, Christopher Grotheer, Stephanie Schneider, Tina Hermann, Nico Walther and Philipp Wobeto won the silver medal in the mixed team event at the IBSF World Championships in Königssee. They finished behind another German team.

At the beginning of the 2017-18 season, German bobsleigh coach René Spies paired Buckwitz with Mariama Jamanka. The pair were nicknamed the "Berlin Bob", as Buckwitz and Jamanka are both from Berlin. Buckwitz and Jamanka won a silver medal at the 2018 Bobsleigh European Championships. At the 2018 Winter Olympics, Buckwitz and Jamanka competed in the two-woman event and won the gold medal. The win was unexpected, as the other German bobsleigh, containing Stephanie Schneider and Annika Drazek, was the favourite to win. German teams won all three of the bobsleigh events at the Games, and Buckwitz was the first person from Schöneiche to win an Olympic gold medal. As a result of her Olympic win, Buckwitz was awarded the Silbernes Lorbeerblatt (Silver Laurel Leaf), and was voted Brandenburg's Sportswoman of the Year.

Buckwitz and Jamanka won the opening race of the 2018–19 Bobsleigh World Cup in Sigulda, Latvia. Buckwitz has also competed in monobob events. At the 2022 Winter Olympics, Buckwitz and Kim Kalicki came fourth in the two-woman event.

Personal life
Buckwitz is from Schöneiche, Berlin, Germany. Aside from her bobsleigh career, she has worked as a state police officer. In February 2022, Buckwitz was represented in the Olympic edition of the German Playboy magazine with a photo series. She was also featured on half of the covers, with Austrian skeleton racer Janine Flock the other half of the covers.

World Cup results
All results are sourced from the International Bobsleigh and Skeleton Federation (IBSF).

Two-woman

Monobob

References

External links
 
 Lisa Buckwitz at the German Bobsleigh, Luge, and Skeleton Federation 

1994 births
Living people
German female bobsledders
Olympic bobsledders of Germany
Bobsledders at the 2018 Winter Olympics
Bobsledders at the 2022 Winter Olympics
Sportspeople from Berlin
Olympic gold medalists for Germany
Medalists at the 2018 Winter Olympics
Olympic medalists in bobsleigh
German police officers
21st-century German women